David Luke Norman (October 12, 1924 – February 6, 1995) was an American attorney who served as the United States Assistant Attorney General for the Civil Rights Division from 1971 to 1973 and as an Associate Judge of the Superior Court of the District of Columbia from 1973 to 1983.

He died of pneumonia on February 6, 1995, in Washington, D.C. at age 70.

References

1924 births
1995 deaths
United States Assistant Attorneys General for the Civil Rights Division
Judges of the Superior Court of the District of Columbia
Nixon administration personnel
Washington, D.C., Republicans